Parakkai Lake is a lake in Kanniyakumari district in the state of Tamil Nadu, India. It is located near the southern tip of India, just to the north of Parakkai village and west of the town of Suchindram.

References

External links
Flickr image

Lakes of Tamil Nadu
Kanyakumari district